Kosior (sometimes spelled Kossior) is a surname of Polish origin. Notable people include:

 Mateusz Kossior, 16th-century Polish painter and sculptor
 Stanisław Kosior (1889–1939), Soviet politician

See also
 

Polish-language surnames